Felcra Football Club or Federal Land Consolidation and Rehabilitation Authority Football Club, commonly known as Felcra FC is a Malaysian football club based in Setapak, Kuala Lumpur. The club most recently plays in the second-tier division in Malaysian football, the Malaysia Premier League in 2018.

Felcra FC has participated in the Malaysian football since 2012 in KLFA Division 3 league. 2015 season of FAM League was their debut in the third-tier league. The club is widely known as The Consolidators.

History
Felcra FC was the runner-up of 2013 KLFA Division 2 League after lost to KPKT FC in the final.

2016 season
After securing the seventh spot of the 2015 Malaysia FAM League in Group A, Felcra FC is determined to redeem last season loss by signed on six experienced players; Azizi Matt Rose, Azi Shahril Azmi, Mohd Fazliata Taib, Shahrizal Saad and Mohd Fadzli Saari. Former national midfielder Shahrulnizam Mustapa, was appointed as the club captain based on the leadership qualities and experience.

2017 season
On 5 February, during the first round of Malaysia FA Cup, Felcra FC won over Penjara FC 2–0 scored by Mohd Firdaus Azizul on penalties and Shazuan Ashraf Mathews.

During second window transfer, the club has signed K. Ravindran from MISC-MIFA, Rahizi Rasib from Negeri Sembilan and Alif Samsudin from Melaka United to strengthen the club for the remaining league matches.

Felcra FC secured second place in FAM League in league stage after 14 matches and collected 25 points. The club advanced to knock-out stage and defeated Terengganu City by 2–1 on aggregate in the two-leg quarter-finals.

Eventually, the club lost in the semi-finals against Sime Darby.

2018 season

After Sime Darby announced their withdrawal from the Premier League participation in November 2017, Felcra FC were invited as their replacement. In their first season in the 2018 Malaysia Premier League, the team achieved second place, behind champions Felda United FC and above more established state teams and clubs in the league. The position means they have been promoted to a higher league for second season in a row.

But at the end of the year, media reported that the main backer for the club, Felcra Berhad, will pull out their financing of the club due to restructuring of its group of companies, and their CEO have announced they will disband the team unless it is sponsored by other company. Malaysia Football League have given Felcra FC until November 15 to decide whether to continue participating in Super League or pulling out. Felcra FC management confirmed their pull-out of the team from Malaysia Football League controlled competitions on 15 November 2018, and pledged to settle all their players and staffs wages before ending their contracts.

Players

Current squad

First-team squad

Transfers

For recent transfers, see List of Malaysian football transfers 2018

Club officials

Managerial history
Head coaches by years (2013–present)

Captain history
Captain by years (2015–present)

Honours

League

 Malaysia Premier League
 Runners-up (1): 2018

Achievement

Sponsors
The following are the sponsors of Felcra FC:

Title Sponsor
 Felcra Berhad
 Kolej Felcra

Shirt Sponsor
 Uhlsport

Partners / Sponsors
 University of Malaya
 Sportflex Malaysia
 Kamal Sports

Kits

References

External links
 
 

 
Malaysia FAM League clubs
Football clubs in Kuala Lumpur
Football clubs in Malaysia